The list of ship launches in 1874 includes a chronological list of some ships launched in 1874.


References

Sources

1874
Ship launches